Yana Qaqa (Quechua yana black, qaqa rock, "black rock", also spelled Yana Khakha) is a mountain in the Bolivian Andes which reaches a height of approximately . It is located in the Cochabamba Department, Quillacollo Province, Vinto Municipality. Yana Qaqa lies southeast of Qiñwani.

References 

Mountains of Cochabamba Department